
Gmina Darłowo is a rural gmina (administrative district) in Sławno County, West Pomeranian Voivodeship, in north-western Poland. Its seat is the town of Darłowo, although the town is not part of the territory of the gmina.

Villages
Gmina Darłowo contains the villages and settlements of Barzowice, Bobolin, Boryszewo, Borzyszkowo, Bukowo Morskie, Cisowo, Czarnolas, Dąbki, Dąbkowice, Darłowiec, Dobiesław, Dobiesław-Kolonia, Domasławice, Drozdowo, Gleźnówko, Gleźnowo, Gorzebądz, Jeżyce, Jeżyczki, Jeżyczki-Kolonia, Kępka, Kopań, Kopnica, Kowalewice, Kowalewiczki, Krupy, Leśnica, Nowy Jarosław, Nowy Kraków, Palczewice, Pęciszewko, Porzecze, Różkowo, Rusko, Sińczyca, Słowinko, Słowino, Spławie, Stary Jarosław, Sulimice, Trzmielewo, Wicie, Wiekowice, Wiekowo, Zagórzyn, Zakrzewo (including Zakrzewo Dolne and Zakrzewo Górne), Zielnowo and Żukowo Morskie.

Neighbouring gminas
Gmina Darłowo is bordered by the town of Darłowo and by the gminas of Malechowo, Mielno, Postomino, Sianów and Sławno.

References
Polish official population figures 2006

Darlowo
Sławno County